Recording Artists and Music Professionals with Disabilities (RAMPD) is a global network of established creators and professionals in the music industry who identify as having a disability, founded in 2021. RAMPD is best known for its efforts working to make the Grammy Awards more accessible and inclusive of people with disabilities.

History
RAMPD was founded in May 2021, by recording artist Lachi after a public talk between The Recording Academy and several disabled artists revealed there was a serious lack of visibility, access, and representation for professional disabled artists. Lachi was joined by violinist and songwriter Gaelynn Lea, and other established disabled music professionals, to officially launch RAMPD in January 2022.

RAMPD has since partnered or collaborated with prominent music and entertainment organizations, including Folk Alliance International, American Association of Independent Music, The Recording Academy, NIVA and others to help bring awareness and accessibility through panel discussions, programming and publications.

Mission
RAMPD's mission is to amplify disability culture, promote disability inclusion and advocate for accessibility in the music industry. RAMPD defines disability culture as a celebration of the vast diversity of the disability experience and includes the worldviews,  perspectives, contributions, art, words, and music of the disability community.

Notable work
RAMPD partnered with the Recording Academy to bring accessibility to the 64th Grammy Awards ceremony on April 3, 2022, and the 65th Annual Grammy Awards on February 6, 2023. The global awards show possessed a visibly ramped dais, American Sign Language on the red carpet, and live caption and Audio description for home viewers.

Awards and nominations

References

External links

Music industry associations
Music organizations based in the United States
Organizations based in New York City
Organizations established in 2021
Disability organizations based in the United States
Disability organizations